Rafaela Köhler Zanella (born 9 August 1986, in Santa Maria) is Brazilian model and beauty pageant titleholder of German and Italian descent who represented her country in the Miss Universe 2006 pageant.

Miss Brasil 2006
Zanella was elected Miss Brasil 2006 on 8 April 2006, representing her state, Rio Grande do Sul.

Miss Universe 2006
In the Miss Universe 2006 pageant, which took place on 23 July 2006 in Los Angeles, California, United States, Zanella placed in the semifinals, among the top 20.

References

1986 births
Brazilian people of German descent
Brazilian people of Italian descent
People from Rio Grande do Sul
Living people
Miss Brazil winners
Brazilian female models
Miss Universe 2006 contestants